Lone Hertz (born 23 April 1939) is a Danish film actress. She has appeared in more than 40 films since 1951.

Filmography 

  (1996)
  (1985)
  (1976)
 Me, Too, in the Mafia (1974)
 Erasmus Montanus (1973)
 Takt og tone i himmelsengen (1972)
 Joan (1972)
 Hurra for de blå husarer (1970)
 Nøglen til paradis (1970)
 Frøken Rosita – Blomsternes sprog (1970)
  (1969)
 Dyrlægens plejebørn (1968)
 Doktor Glas (1968)
  (1967)
  (1966)
 Landmandsliv (1965)
 Et fjernsynsmareridt (1964)
 Sommer i Tyrol (1964)
 Tine (1964)
 Slottet (1964)
 Selvmordsskolen (1964)
 Bussen (1963)
  (1963)
 Frøken Nitouche (1963)
 Sikke'n familie (1963)
 Vi har det jo dejligt (1963)
 Oskar (1962)
 Recensenten og dyret (1962)
 Sømænd og svigermødre (1962)
 Den kære familie (1962)
 Det tossede paradis (1962)
 Enetime (1962)
 Stuepigerne (1962)
  (1961)
  (1961)
  (1959)
 Bundfald (1957)
  (1952)
  (1951)
  (1951)

References

External links 

 

1939 births
Actresses from Copenhagen
Best Actress Bodil Award winners
Danish film actresses
Living people